WOKV-FM (104.5 MHz) is a radio station in Atlantic Beach, Florida, United States, serving the Jacksonville metropolitan area. It airs a news/talk format branded as "News 104.5 WOKV". The station is owned by Cox Media Group and broadcasts from studios and a transmitter in the Southside district of Jacksonville.

History
WAQB-FM signed on in July 1967 at 104.9 MHz.  It was the FM counterpart of WKTX (1600 AM); its effective radiated power was only 3,000 watts, a fraction of its current power, and it simulcast WKTX's middle of the road music format.  Around 1970, it changed its call sign to WJNJ-FM.

In 1979, the station changed its callsign again, this time to WFYV.  The station changed its frequency to 104.5 MHz, coupled with a dramatic boost in power. WFYV began running 100,000 watts, the maximum permitted for non-grandfathered FM stations, allowing it to be heard throughout Jacksonville's expanding suburbs, from Southeast Georgia to St. Augustine and Gainesville. On March 10, 1980, WFYV became Rock 105 with an album rock format.  Over the years, the station gradually shifted towards classic rock.

In 2010, following a format change at rival rock station WPLA, WFYV shifted from classic rock to mainstream rock under the name Rock 104.5, Jacksonville's Best Rock.

On April 10, 2013, Cox Media announced that "Rock 104.5" was going to "retire", effective April 28. On that day, at 10:07 p.m., the station signed off with a live version of "Free Bird" by Lynyrd Skynyrd, followed by a minute of silence. After that, the station began stunting with a 5-minute loop of teasers of potential formats: hot talk as "Raw Talk, 104.5 The Bone", soft AC as "Easy 104.5", country as "104.5 Brad-FM", urban contemporary as "Power 104.5" and Spanish tropical music as "Caliente 104.5".   During the stunting, rock listeners were redirected to sister alternative rock station WXXJ (then at 102.9 FM, now 106.5 FM).

The stunting lasted until midnight on May 1, 2013, when WFYV-FM changed to a simulcast of news/talk-formatted WOKV, abandoning all music entirely. WOKV had previously been heard at FM on 106.5 MHz. On May 16, 2013, WFYV-FM changed its call sign to WOKV-FM. The FM and AM frequencies remained a simulcast until WOKV AM flipped to sports on January 2, 2019.

Programming
Weekdays on WOKV-FM begin with Jacksonville's Morning News with Rich Jones. The rest of the weekday schedule is syndicated conservative talk shows along with locally anchored news, traffic and weather reports. WOKV hosts include Brian Kilmeade, Rush Limbaugh, Sean Hannity, Chad Benson, Clark Howard, Dana Loesch and Coast to Coast AM with George Noory. Weekends feature programs on money, health, gardening, home repair and the syndicated Bill Cunningham show.  Some weekend hours are paid brokered programming. Most hours on nights and weekends begin with world and national news from Fox News Radio.

The HD2 subchannel airs "Hot 99.5", an urban adult contemporary format. It feeds translator W258CN (99.5 FM).

As WFYV-FM, on-air hosts included Lex and Terry, Bubba The Love Sponge and Doug "The Greaseman" Tracht.

On-air incidents
In September 24, 2008, WFYV-FM host Gregg Stepp left the station to take a job in Bakersfield, California, as a Program Director. Stepp was then asked by WFYV-FM management to create a bit that would bring some attention to the station before announcing the return of "The Greaseman" to the Jacksonville airwaves a couple weeks later. Stepp decided to make everyone think he had quit live on-the-air, by giving listeners the idea that station management were planning on firing him but he was quitting before they had the chance. Stepp concluded his bit by saying:

This was followed by 11 seconds of dead air, then music played. It was not revealed until much later that Stepp's "quitting" WFYV-FM was merely a bit.

References

External links

FM translator

OKV-FM
News and talk radio stations in the United States
Cox Media Group
Radio stations established in 1967
1967 establishments in Florida